David Soslanovich Karaev (born 10 March 1995) is a Russian football player. He plays for Torpedo Moscow. He also holds Azerbaijani citizenship.

Club career
He made his debut in the Russian Football National League for FC SKA-Energiya Khabarovsk on 7 July 2013 in a game against FC Salyut Belgorod.

In February 2020, Karaev went on trial with CSKA Moscow

On 15 June 2020, he signed a contract with FC Ural Yekaterinburg. He made his Russian Premier League debut for Ural on 10 August 2020 in a game against FC Dynamo Moscow, he substituted Andrei Panyukov in the 71st minute.

On 28 February 2021, he moved to FC Caspiy in Kazakhstan on loan until the end of the 2020–21 season.

On 7 June 2022, Karaev signed a contract with FC Torpedo Moscow for two years with an option for the third year.

Career statistics

References

External links
 
 
 
 

1995 births
Sportspeople from Vladikavkaz
Russian sportspeople of Azerbaijani descent
Living people
Russian footballers
Azerbaijani footballers
Azerbaijan youth international footballers
Association football forwards
Association football midfielders
FC SKA-Khabarovsk players
FC TSK Simferopol players
FC Neftekhimik Nizhnekamsk players
FC Armavir players
FC Spartak Vladikavkaz players
FC SKA Rostov-on-Don players
FC Khimki players
FC KAMAZ Naberezhnye Chelny players
FC Ural Yekaterinburg players
FC Caspiy players
FC Torpedo Moscow players
Russian First League players
Russian Second League players
Russian Premier League players
Kazakhstan Premier League players
Russian expatriate footballers
Azerbaijani expatriate footballers
Expatriate footballers in Kazakhstan
Russian expatriate sportspeople in Kazakhstan
Azerbaijani expatriate sportspeople in Kazakhstan